Alexander Gründler (born 24 July 1993) is an Austrian footballer who plays for FC Wacker Innsbruck.

References

Austrian footballers
Austrian Football Bundesliga players
2. Liga (Austria) players
Austrian Regionalliga players
1993 births
Living people
FC Wacker Innsbruck (2002) players
SC Wiener Neustadt players
Association football wingers